Diego Martín Novaretti, (born 9 May 1985), sometimes known as El Flaco, is an Argentine footballer who plays as a centre-back for Belgrano.

Club career

Club Atlético Belgrano
He made his professional debut with Club Atlético Belgrano in 2006. Novaretti is known for his height and quickness.

Toluca
It was rumoured that Novaretti might join Deportivo Toluca since the departure of Paulo da Silva, and José Manuel de la Torre expressed a great interest in acquiring him for the team. On 22 July 2009, it became official that Novaretti was to join Toluca. But currently he won't play as he escaped from his last club without paying anything for the transfer. He made his debut on 6 September 2009 against Morelia. He played the whole 90 minutes. A game that finished 1–0 For Toluca. He scored his first goal for Toluca on 4 April 2010 against Estudiantes Tecos. A game that finished 5–0 for Toluca.

S.S. Lazio
In the summer of 2013, Novaretti arrived as a free agent joining Lazio from Toluca. Novaretti signed a 4-year deal at the club. Novaretti was originally targeted by Manchester City, but their interest waned after Roberto Mancini was relieved of his duties.

He made his debut for Lazio in Serie A on 25 August 2013 in Lazio's 2–1 win against Udinese. While 19 September 2013, Novaretti made his debut in the Europa League, against Legia Warsaw; Novaretti replaced Keita Baldé as a substitute. In his first season Novaretti made 17 appearances in all competitions during the 2013–14 season for Lazio.

Honours
Mexican league : 1
Toluca: Bicentennial 2010

References

External links

1985 births
Living people
Sportspeople from Córdoba Province, Argentina
Argentine footballers
Argentine expatriate footballers
Primera Nacional players
Argentine Primera División players
Liga MX players
Serie A players
Club Atlético Belgrano footballers
Deportivo Toluca F.C. players
S.S. Lazio players
Club León footballers
Querétaro F.C. footballers
Rosario Central footballers
Argentine expatriate sportspeople in Mexico
Argentine expatriate sportspeople in Italy
Expatriate footballers in Mexico
Expatriate footballers in Italy
Association football defenders